Helen Amanda Loggie  (1895, Bellingham, Washington - 1976) was a U.S. artist, primarily known for her etchings of trees and coastlines.

She attended Smith College in Massachusetts. Between 1916 and 1924, she studied at the Art Students League of New York. Here she began to develop a style which rejected such modernist themes as those trumpeted by the Ashcan School. She toured Europe in 1926-27 where she made an extensive body of sketches and paintings. Soon before returning home to Washington, she met etcher and printer John Taylor Arms, beginning a 25-year collaboration. In 1957 she was elected an Academician of the National Academy of Design.

In 1930-31 Loggie built a house on the shores of Eastsound, Orcas Island, where she spent most summers creating her small pencil drawings and etchings. Her archives, consisting of numerous prints and drawings, reside in the collection at the Western Gallery of Art at Western Washington University in Bellingham, Washington. As of 2020, a collection of Loggie's work, including ephemera, drawings, etchings and oils are at The Helen Loggie Museum of Art aka The Loggie in Bellingham, Washington. The Museum is housed in the former Territorial Courthouse built in 1858 and is known as the oldest masonry building in Washington state. The Museum is privately held. www.theloggie.org

References

External links
The Helen Loggie Museum of Art
The Helen Loggie Gallery :: The Lambiel Museum 
Helen Loggie: Celebrating a Northwest Legacy: A Retrospective: 1917 - 1956
Art by Helen Loggie in the Seattle Public Library's Northwest Art Collection
Helen Loggie - askart.com

American artists
1895 births
1976 deaths
Smith College alumni
Art Students League of New York alumni